The Two and a half cent coin was struck in the Kingdom of the Netherlands between 1818 and 1942. All coins were minted in Utrecht.

Dimensions and weight

Versions

Gallery

References

External links
Obverses and reverses

Guilder
Coins of the Netherlands